The Brothers Schellenberg (German: Die Brüder Schellenberg) is a 1926 German silent drama film directed by Karl Grune and starring Conrad Veidt, Lil Dagover and Liane Haid. It was shot at the Babelsberg Studios in Berlin with sets designed by the art director Karl Görge. It was based on a novel by Bernhard Kellermann. It premiered at the Palast-am-Zoo.

Cast
 Conrad Veidt as Wenzel Schellenberg / Michael Schellenberg 
 Lil Dagover as Esther 
 Liane Haid as Jenny Florian 
 Henri De Vries as Der alte Rauchenstein 
 Werner Fuetterer as Georg Weidenbach 
 Bruno Kastner as Kaczinsky 
 Julius Falkenstein as Erster Verehrer Esthers 
 Wilhelm Bendow as Sweiter Verehrer Esthers 
 Erich Kaiser-Titz as Dritter Verehrer Esthers 
 Paul Morgan as Schieber 
 Jaro Fürth as Wucherer 
 Frida Richard as Verarmte Witwe

References

Bibliography
 Kreimeier, Klaus. The Ufa Story: A History of Germany's Greatest Film Company, 1918-1945. University of California Press, 1999.

External links

1926 films
1926 drama films
German drama films
Films of the Weimar Republic
German silent feature films
Films directed by Karl Grune
Films based on German novels
Films based on works by Bernhard Kellermann
Films about twin brothers
Films produced by Erich Pommer
UFA GmbH films
German black-and-white films
Silent drama films
Films shot at Babelsberg Studios
1920s German films
1920s German-language films